The  1979-79 French Rugby Union Championship was won by  Narbonne    beating Stade Bagnérais in the final.

Formula 

The tournament was played by 80 clubs divided into two groups (A and B) of 40.

The "élite" (group A)  was formed by four pools of ten clubs.  The seven better of each pool (28 teams) were qualified for knockout stages, with four teams from group B.

Qualification round

Group A 
In bold the clubs qualified for the next round. The teams are listed according to the final ranking

Group B
In bold the clubs qualified for the next round. The teams are listed according to the final ranking

Knockout stages

"Last 32" 
In bold the clubs qualified for the next round

"Last 16" 
In bold the clubs qualified for the next round

Quarter of finals 
In bold the clubs qualified for the next round

Semifinals

Final

External links
 Compte rendu finale de 1979 lnr.fr

1979
France 1979
Championship